The Danit class is a series of 23 container ships built by Daewoo Shipbuilding & Marine Engineering in South Korea. The ships have a maximum theoretical capacity of 13,050 to 14,036 twenty-foot equivalent units (TEU).

List of ships

References 

Container ship classes
Ships built by Daewoo Shipbuilding & Marine Engineering